Tinsulanonda Stadium is a multi-purpose stadium in Songkhla, Thailand. Named after the Songkhla-born former Thai Prime Minister Prem Tinsulanonda, it is used mostly for football matches.

The stadium has a capacity of 20,000 but just 2,000 of those spaces are covered in a small single-tiered stand along one touchline. The rest of the stadium is a continuous curving tier. The stadium hosted one of the semi-finals in the 1998 Asian Games men's football tournament.

History
In the early 1970s, the Sports Authority of Thailand has a project to build a stadium in the region in Songkhla. The stadium name is "District 9 Stadium", located in Bo Yang Subdistrict, Mueang District, Songkhla Province, with the support of the construction budget from the Government Lottery Office.

In 1989, Songkhla has been selected to host the National Games causing District 9 stadium to undergo major renovation including changing the stadium name from "District 9 Stadium" to "Tinsulanon Stadium" since that change Tinsulanon Stadium has become an important stadium in the southern region of Thailand to organize sporting events in various categories.

In 1998 Tinsulanon Stadium get the opportunity to host the largest event, such as the 13th Asian Games, 1998, hosted by Thailand at Tinsulanon Stadium. Therefore a major improvement is needed again because the stadium has been selected to be the competition field for football.

Later in 2014, the Sports Authority of Thailand transferred the field supervision to the Provincial Administrative Organization of Songkhla and use a budget of 200 million baht to renovate football fields and other fields by increasing the stadium capacity from 35,000 seats to 45,000 seats and changing into all seats and renovate the grandstand side of the stadium to be a 2-level grandstand with 10,000 seats in order to support the Thailand National Games at Songkhla in 2017.

In 2019, Tinsulanon Stadium has undergone major renovations to accommodate the hosting 2020 AFC U-23 Championship.

International football matches

2020 AFC U-23 Championship

References

External links
Stadium profile and photos

Football venues in Thailand
Multi-purpose stadiums in Thailand
Buildings and structures in Songkhla province
Sport in Songkhla province
Buildings and structures completed in 1995
1995 establishments in Thailand